Acmaeoderopsis is a genus of beetles in the family Buprestidae, containing the following species:

 Acmaeoderopsis chisosensis (Knull, 1952)
 Acmaeoderopsis guttifera (LeConte, 1859)
 Acmaeoderopsis hassayampae (Knull, 1961)
 Acmaeoderopsis hualpaiana (Knull, 1952)
 Acmaeoderopsis hulli (Knull, 1928)
 Acmaeoderopsis jaguarina (Knull, 1938)
 Acmaeoderopsis junki (Théry, 1929)
 Acmaeoderopsis paravaripilis (Barr, 1972)
 Acmaeoderopsis prosopis Davidson, 2006
 Acmaeoderopsis rockefelleri (Cazier, 1951)
 Acmaeoderopsis vaga (Barr, 1972)
 Acmaeoderopsis varipilis (Van Dyke, 1934)
 Acmaeoderopsis westcotti (Barr, 1972)

References

Buprestidae genera